This is a demography of the population of Colombia including population density, ethnicity, education level, health of the populace, economic status, religious affiliations and other aspects of the population. It is the second-most populous country in South America after Brazil.

The Demography of Colombia is characterized by being the third-most populous country in Latin America, after Mexico and Brazil. Colombia experienced rapid population growth like most countries, but four decades of an armed conflict pushed millions of Colombians out of the country. However, a rebound economy in the 2000s in urban centres improved the situation of living standards for Colombians in a traditional class stratified economy.

Census

2021 Census
From January to October 2021, 9.5% of the babies were given birth by Venezuelan mothers. According to the entity during that period, there were 505,114 births and 48,075 were to Venezuelan mothers. In 2017, the birth rate of migrant mothers from Venezuela was 0%, but it has been increasing since 2020, when it was 9.1%.

The births in Colombia have decreased, since from 2015 to 2020, a 12.5% ​​lower birth rate. In 2021 there was 12 births for every 1,000 people.

Bogotá and San Andrés are the places with the greatest reduction in births, while the departments of Guainía, Vichada and La Guajira had the highest increases, Guainía had an increase of 108.1%.

2018 Census 
According to the 2018 census, Colombia has 48,258,494 inhabitants within its territory. All the data below is available in the DANE Census results.

Current vital statistics by department
Total Fertility Rates (number of children born per mother) and the expected number of births and deaths in 2021. Census made in 2021.

20th and 21st centuries 
Colombian census from 1912:
 On 1912 census estimated 5,472,604 inhabitants.
 On 1918 census estimated 5,855,077 inhabitants.
 On 1928 census estimated 7,851,110 inhabitants.
 On 1938 census estimated 8,697,041 inhabitants.
 On 1951 census estimated 11,548,172 inhabitants.
 On 1964 census estimated 17,484,508 inhabitants.
 On 1973 census estimated 20,785,234 inhabitants.
 On 1985 census estimated 27,837,932 inhabitants.
 On 1993 census estimated 33,109,839 inhabitants.
 On 2005 census estimated 42,888,592 inhabitants.
 On 2018 census estimated 48,258,494 inhabitants.

UN estimates
The proportion of children below the age of 15 in 2015 was 24.3%, 68.7% was between 15 and 65 years of age, while 7% was 65 years or older
.

Age structure of the population
Structure of the population according to the 2018 census results:

Urbanization 

Movement from rural to urban areas was very heavy in the middle of the twentieth century, but has since tapered off. The urban population increased from 31% of the total population in 1938, to 57% in 1951 and about 70% by 1990. Currently the figure is about 77%. The list of the most populated cities in the country only contains the population living in the urban area of the municipalities, according to the results of the 2018 population census.

Vital statistics

UN estimates
The Population Departement of the United Nations prepared the following estimates.

Official births and deaths statistics

Current vital statistics

Ethnicity 

Colombia is ethnically diverse, its original people descending from the original native inhabitants, Spanish and European colonists, Africans originally brought to the country as slaves, and 20th-century immigrants from Europe and the Middle East, all contributing to a diverse cultural heritage. The demographic distribution reflects a pattern that is influenced by colonial history. Whites tend to live mainly in urban centers, like Bogotá, Medellín or Cali, and the burgeoning highland cities. The populations of the major cities also include mestizos.. Mestizos include artisans and small tradesmen that have played a major part in the urban expansion of recent decades.

The 2005 census (outdated) reported that the "non-ethnic population", consisting of whites and mestizos (those of majority Indigenous American ancestry), constituted 86% of the national population. 10.6% is of black ancestry. Indigenous Colombians comprise 3.4% of the population. Less than 0.01% of the population is Roma. An extraofficial estimate considers that the 49% of the Colombian population is Mestizo or of mixed European and Amerindian ancestry, and that approximately 37% is White, mainly of Spanish lineage, but there is also a large population of Middle East descent; among the upper class there is a considerable input of Italian ancestry.

Many of the Indigenous peoples experienced a reduction in population during the Spanish rule and many others were absorbed into the mestizo population, but the remainder currently represents over eighty distinct cultures. Reserves (resguardos) established for indigenous peoples occupy  (27% of the country's total) and are inhabited by more than 800,000 people. Some of the largest indigenous groups are the Wayuu, the Paez, the Pastos, the Emberá and the Zenú. The departments of La Guajira, Cauca, Nariño, Córdoba and Sucre have the largest indigenous populations.

The Organización Nacional Indígena de Colombia (ONIC), founded at the first National Indigenous Congress in 1982, is an organization representing the indigenous peoples of Colombia. In 1991, Colombia signed and ratified the current international law concerning indigenous peoples, Indigenous and Tribal Peoples Convention, 1989.

Black Africans were brought as slaves, mostly to the coastal lowlands, beginning early in the 16th century and continuing into the 19th century. Large Afro-Colombian communities are found today on the Caribbean and Pacific coasts. The population of the department of Chocó, running along the northern portion of Colombia's Pacific coast, is over 70% black. Britons and Jamaicans migrated mainly to the islands of San Andres and Providencia Islands. A number of other Europeans and North Americans migrated to the country in the late 19th and early 20th centuries, including people from the former USSR during and after the Second World War.

Many immigrant communities have settled on the Caribbean coast, in particular recent immigrants from the Middle East. Barranquilla (the largest city of the Colombian Caribbean) and other Caribbean cities have the largest populations of Lebanese, Palestinian, Phoenician and other Middle Easterners. There are also important communities of Romanis and Jews. There is a major migration trend of Venezuelans, due to the political crisis and economic collapse in Venezuela.

Languages 

Spanish (of which Colombia has the third-largest population of speakers in the world after Mexico and the United States) is the official language, and there are small communities in urban areas speaking other European languages such as German, French, English, Italian and Portuguese. There are 65 indigenous languages and two Creole languages, one creole in San Basilio de Palenque and one in San Andrés; and also San Andrés is the only place of Colombia where are three official languages: Spanish, English and a creole language.

Religion

The National Administrative Department of Statistics (DANE) does not collect religious statistics, and accurate reports are difficult to obtain. However, based on various studies and a survey, about 90% of the population adheres to Christianity, the majority of which (70.9%) are Roman Catholic, while a significant minority (16.7%) adhere to Protestantism (primarily Evangelicalism). Some 4.7% of the population is atheist or agnostic, while 3.5% claim to believe in God but do not follow a specific religion. 1.8% of Colombians adhere to Jehovah's Witnesses and Adventism and less than 1% adhere to other religions, such as Islam, Judaism, Buddhism, Mormonism, Hinduism, Indigenous religions, Hare Krishna movement, Rastafari movement, Eastern Orthodox Church, and spiritual studies. The remaining people either did not respond or replied that they did not know. In addition to the above statistics, 35.9% of Colombians reported that they did not practice their faith actively.

While Colombia remains a mostly Roman Catholic country by baptism numbers, the 1991 Colombian constitution guarantees freedom of religion and all religious faiths and churches are equally free before the law.

Migration 

Historically, a sizable percentage of Colombian emigration has also been motivated by the need to escape from political persecution and bipartisan violence during the periods of "La Violencia" (1948–1958), and later due to the effects of the nation's current conflict (since 1964). This has resulted in numerous applications for political asylum abroad.

Colombians have emigrated in comparably high rates to the United States. Other Colombians migrated to Canada and Europe (most to Spain, but also to France, Italy, the United Kingdom and Sweden). Among other locations.

Foreign-born population 2018 census

Colombian population living abroad

CIA World Factbook demographic statistics 

The following demographic statistics are from the CIA World Factbook, unless otherwise indicated.

Population 
48,637,910 (May 2016 est.)

Median age 
total: 27.7 years

male: 26.7 years

female: 28.6 years (2010 est.)

Sex ratio 
At birth: 1.03 male(s)/female

Under 15 years: 1.02 male(s)/female

15–64 years: 0.95 male(s)/female

65 years and over: 0.75 male(s)/female

total population: 0.96 male(s)/female (2009 est.)

HIV/AIDS – adult prevalence rate 
0.7% (2007 est.)

HIV/AIDS – people living with HIV/AIDS 
170,000 (2007 est.)

HIV/AIDS – deaths 
9,800 (2007 est.)

Nationality 
noun: Colombia
adjective: Colombian(s)

Literacy 

definition: age 15 and over can read and write

total population: 99.4%

male: 99.1% (2018 census)

female: 99.7% (2018 census)

Notes

References

External links 
  Colombian Department of Statistics
  1951 Census

 
Society of Colombia